Joseph Christopher McConnell Jr. (30 January 1922 – 25 August 1954) was a United States Air Force fighter pilot who was the top American flying ace during the Korean War. A native of Dover, New Hampshire, Captain McConnell was credited with shooting down 16 MiG-15s while flying North American F-86 Sabres. He was awarded the Distinguished Service Cross,  Silver Star, and the Distinguished Flying Cross for his actions in aerial combat. McConnell was the first American triple jet-on-jet fighter ace and is still the top-scoring American jet ace.

Early life
McConnell was born on January 30, 1922, in Dover, New Hampshire. He enlisted in the U.S. Army on October 15, 1940, and served in the U.S. Army Medical Corps until entering the Aviation Cadet Program.

Military service

World War II
McConnell entered the U.S. Army Air Forces Aviation Cadet Program in 1943 during World War II. His dream of becoming a pilot was dashed when, instead of being sent to pilot training, he was assigned to navigator training. He was commissioned a second lieutenant and received his navigator wings on September 18, 1944. He next completed Consolidated B-24 Liberator training and joined the 448th Bomber Group in England in January 1945. He flew 60 combat missions in Europe as a B-24 Liberator navigator. Research in 2023 by storiesofthe448th.com has showed this figure to be erroneous, the actual figure being much less. He remained in the Army Air Forces after the war and entered pilot training in 1946. McConnell finally achieved his goal of becoming a pilot, receiving his USAF pilot wings on February 25, 1948, at Williams AFB in Arizona. He then served in various fighter squadrons of the USAF.

Korean War
 

The Korean War began on 25 June 1950 when North Korea invaded South Korea. As the war continued to spread throughout the Korean peninsula, McConnell sought to become part of it. He was assigned to the 39th Fighter-Interceptor Squadron of the 51st Fighter-Interceptor Wing in Korea in September 1952. Gifted with exceptional eyesight, McConnell proved to be an aggressive MiG hunter, but he did not shoot down his first enemy aircraft until the following year. He scored all of his victories during a four-month period from 14 January to 18 May 1953.

Captain McConnell flew at least three different F-86 Sabres, all named "Beauteous Butch". The name referred to the nickname of his wife, Pearl "Butch" Brown. His first eight kills were scored in an F-86E-10 (serial number 51–2753, buzz number FU-753). The second Sabre was an F-86F-15 (serial number 51–12971, buzz number FU-971). McConnell shot down a MiG-15 piloted by Soviet ace Semyon Fedorets, however, his Sabre was also badly damaged and was forced to bail out. This dramatic mutual kill started with the MiG-15 ambushing the Sabre and manage to damage the Sabre. McConnell reacted quickly and barrel-rolled to the Mig's six and blasted it out of the sky  McConnell ejected over the Yellow Sea. He was rescued within minutes by an American helicopter. The next day he returned to the air and shot down another MiG. The final Sabre McConnell  flew in combat was an F-86F-1 (serial number 51–2910, buzz number FU-910). This aircraft was repainted following his final mission, with the name being changed to "Beauteous Butch II". McConnell, during his last combat mission on 18 May 1953, destroyed two and damaged one of twenty-eight MiG-15 type aircraft over North Korea, bringing his total victory count to 16 destroyed plus 5 damaged and making him America's first triple jet ace.  Immediately after his 16th air victory, McConnell was sent back to the United States, along with Manuel "Pete" Fernandez, the top Air Force ace (14.5 air victories) of the 4th Fighter-Interceptor Wing. McConnell met with the President at the White House and was awarded the Distinguished Service Cross (DSC) for his actions on 18 May 1953, America's second-highest decoration for valor.

Radio broadcast
Captain McConnell appeared as a contestant on the 10 February 1954 airing of the comedy quiz program "You Bet Your Life" starring Groucho Marx.

Death
McConnell returned to his home in Apple Valley, California, and was stationed at George Air Force Base, California where he was assigned to the 445th Fighter Squadron and continued flying F-86s. On 6 August 1953, the people of Apple Valley gave a new home, the "Appreciation House", to Capt. McConnell. The house was completed in 45 hours with all land, material, and labor donated. In 1954, he was temporarily assigned to the service test program for the new F-86H Sabre. This was the last and most powerful version of the Sabre, and was intended to be a nuclear-capable fighter-bomber. On 25 August 1954, while testing the fifth production F-86H-1-NA (serial number 52-1981) at Edwards Air Force Base, McConnell was killed in a crash near the base following a control malfunction.  The cause of the accident was attributed to a missing bolt. Then-Major Chuck Yeager was assigned to investigate the crash and replicated the malfunction at a much higher altitude. This height advantage allowed him to safely regain control of the aircraft before it hit the desert floor.

The 1955 film The McConnell Story, starring Alan Ladd and June Allyson, chronicles his life story. The book Sabre Jet Ace (1959) by Charles Ira Coombs is a fictionalized biography for young readers covering his experiences as a fighter pilot in Korea.

McConnell's wife, Pearl "Butch" McConnell, died in 2008 at the age of 86. She never remarried and was buried with Captain McConnell at Victor Valley Memorial Park in Victorville, California.

Military decorations

His decorations include:

Distinguished Service Cross citation
Citation:

See also

List of Korean War air aces

References

Notes

Bibliography

 Baugher, Joe. "USAAS-USAAC-USAAF-USAF Aircraft Serial Numbers – 1908 to Present", USAF Serials. Retrieved: 5 March 2011.
 Coombs, Charles. Sabre Jet Ace (The American Adventure Series). Evanston, Illinois, USA: Row, Peterson and Company, 1961, First edition 1959.
 Davis, Larry. MiG Alley. Carrollton, Texas: Squadron/Signal Publications, 1978. .
 Gurney, Gene. Five Down and Glory. New York: G. P. Putnam's Sons, 1958. .
 Shores, Christopher. Fighter Aces. London: Hamlyn Publishing, 1975. .
 Thompson, Warren. F-86 Sabre Aces of the 51st Fighter Wing. London: Osprey, 2006. .

External links
The Crash of McConnell's F-86H
Photograph of McConnell's Sabre showing the name "Beauteous Butch II", "Sabres and Aces", Air Force Magazine, September 2006, p. 85.
Capt. Joseph McConnell; Account of McConnell's Korean War experiences, with photographs
F-86H photograph from National Museum of the USAF
Chinese said they shot down McConnell
Stories of the 448th www.storiesofthe448th.com 

1922 births
1954 deaths
American Korean War flying aces
American test pilots
Aviators from New Hampshire
Aviators killed in aviation accidents or incidents in the United States
People from Apple Valley, California
People from Dover, New Hampshire
Recipients of the Distinguished Flying Cross (United States)
Recipients of the Distinguished Service Cross (United States)
Recipients of the Silver Star
Shot-down aviators
United States Air Force officers
United States Army Air Forces officers
United States Army Air Forces pilots of World War II
Victims of aviation accidents or incidents in 1954
Military personnel from California